Luminar is a universal photo editing software application developed by Skylum (formerly Macphun) available for Windows and macOS.

Luminar works as a standalone application and as a plugin for Adobe and Apple products. It integrates with Adobe Photoshop, Adobe Photoshop Elements, Adobe Lightroom Classic, and Photos for macOS. In 2019, Luminar won a gold award at the Digital Camera Grand Prix for its innovation in the photo editing space. Luminar has also been recognized as the Best Photo Software Product in the 2019 and 2020 by EISA awards. The application has filters, which can be used to edit images. The effects can be combined using layers and masks.  Luminar works directly with raw files.

The latest version to be currently available is Luminar AI, which was released September 2020.

History 
Macphun launched Luminar in November 2016. An update with new tools and features called Luminar Neptune was released in 2017. Initially developed only for macOS, Macphun launched Luminar 2018 for Windows PC version in late 2017. At the same time, the company announced that it will change its name to Skylum.

Luminar 2018, which was launched in November 2017, introduced a RAW develop module, changed the user interface and also added new filters.

Luminar Neo, a more advanced and feature rich modular version of Luminar was released in early 2022 including support for layers, AI masking, extensions and more.

Reception 
Luminar has generally received positive reviews. Tech Radar reviewed the beta version of the application in 2016 and gave it a 4.5 out of 5. MyMac Reviews rated it 9 out of 10. Digital Rev appreciated the number of features offered by the software writing that "amateur Instagrammers and pro-photogs alike will feel like they’re in an Aladdin’s cave of wonders with what’s on offer in that regard," but pointed out that "in general Luminar does suffer from some problems when greater editing functions are stacked up against Lightroom or Photoshop’s."

In 2020, Macworld gave Luminar a rating of 4.5 out of 5 and named it an Editors’ Choice, praising its “breakthrough AI Sky Replacement feature” and saying that it offers “intuitive, easy-to-use image editing.” Digital Camera World gave Luminar 4 a rating of 4 out of 5 stars, pointing out as advantages its integrated image catalog, non-destructive editing, AI Sky Replacement tool, and included plug-in version. Ghacks gave it a four out of five. Writing about Luminar 2018, Digital Trends expressed that it "is an excellent photo editor for beginners and hobbyists, with enough features to appease even some professional photographers."

Appreciating the simple interface of the software, TechRepublic wrote that "Skylum's Luminar 2018, on the other hand, addresses common image issues—including color correction, brightening and darkening, cropping, and applying filters—without requiring you to become an expert in manipulating a variety of palettes, layers, and tools."

In 2017 Luminar and in 2019, Luminar Flex was named the Best Software Plugin in the Lucie Technical Awards. In the same years, Luminar was awarded the Best Imaging Software by TIPA. In 2018, Luminar was named an Editor’s Pick by Outdoor Photographer.

In October 2019, nature photography website Nature TTL reviewed the Luminar 4 software and gave it 5 out of 5.

References 

Photo software
Raster graphics editors
HDR tone mapping software
2017 software